Don Watson (born 1949) is an Australian author, screenwriter, former political adviser, and speechwriter.

Early life
Watson was born in 1949 at Warragul in the Gippsland region of Victoria, and grew up on a farm in nearby Korumburra.

Academia and early career
Watson studied for his undergraduate degree at La Trobe University and latterly completed PhD at Monash University before spending ten years working as an academic historian. He wrote three books on Australian history before turning his hand to TV and the stage. For several years he combined writing political satire for the actor Max Gillies with political speeches for the then Premier of Victoria, John Cain. In 1992, he became Prime Minister of Australia Paul Keating's speech-writer and adviser.

Screenwriting
In addition to regular books, articles and essays, in recent years he has also written feature films, including The Man Who Sued God, starring Billy Connolly and Judy Davis, and Passion, a film about Percy Grainger starring Richard Roxburgh.

Prizes and recognition
Watson's historical work in exposing the role of pioneer pastoralist Angus McMillan as a leader of several massacres of Gunai Kurnai people in Gippsland, Victoria, has often been quoted in articles about the man and the massacres.

In 2014 The Bush: Travels in the Heart of Australia was published to critical acclaim for its content and for the beauty and effectiveness of Watson's writing. It won Book of the Year in the New South Wales Premier's Literary Awards in 2015.

American Journeys was awarded both The Age Book of the Year non-fiction and Book of the Year awards in 2008 It also won the 2008 Walkley Book Award.

Death Sentence, his book about the decay of public language, won the Australian Booksellers Association Book of the Year in 2008

Recollections of a Bleeding Heart: A Portrait of Paul Keating PM published in 2002 was awarded both The Age Book of the Year and non-fiction Prizes, the Courier-Mail Book of the Year, the National Biography Award and the Australian Literary Studies Association's Book of the Year.

Watson's 2001 Quarterly Essay Rabbit Syndrome: Australia and America won the inaugural Alfred Deakin Prize in the Victorian Premier's Literary Awards.

Redfern Park Speech
In Recollections of a Bleeding Heart, Watson described his writing of the Redfern Park Speech in 1992, which, he claims, by way of praising Keating for his courage, the Prime Minister delivered without changing a single word. Keating has disputed Watson's authorship, saying the speech developed out of dozens of conversations between them.

Personal life
Watson is divorced from the publisher Hilary McPhee.  He has an adult daughter from an earlier marriage, and two young children with the writer Chloe Hooper.

Bibliography
Brian Fitzpatrick: A Radical Life (1978) Hale & Iremonger 
Caledonia Australis (1984) William Collins 
Story of Australia (1984) McPhee Gribble
Recollections of a Bleeding Heart: A Portrait of Paul Keating PM (2002) 
Death Sentence: The Decay of Public Language (2003) 
Watson's Dictionary of Weasel Words: Contemporary Cliches, Cant and Management Jargon (2004) 
American Journeys (2008) 
On Indignation (2008) Melbourne University Press 
Bendable Learnings. The Wisdom of Modern Management. Sydney, Knopf. (2009) 
Worst Words: A compendium of contemporary cant, gibberish and jargon. Vintage Australia (2015) 

A Single Tree (2016) Penguin Australia 
There it is again: Collected Writings (2018) Vintage
The Passion of Private White (2022) Scribner

References

External links
Don Watson at Perth Writers' Festival 2010 ABC Big Ideas
 Don Watson's author profile at Penguin Books Australia
Don Watson at Random House Australia
The Unknown Soldier Speech
The Wayward Tourist
Age Article The Lives Sent Down The Drain
Don Watson on speech-making in American politics on SlowTV
ABC Fora MWF session with David Sedaris and David Rakoff
Talking about Death Sentence on ABC Radio Life Matters
Talking about Recollections of a Bleeding Heart Romana Koval – ABC Radio
 Watch a recording of the Redfern Address on australianscreen online
 The Redfern Address was added to the National Film and Sound Archive's Sounds of Australia registry in 2010

1949 births
20th-century Australian non-fiction writers
21st-century Australian non-fiction writers
Australian essayists
Australian historians
Australian humorists
Australian literary critics
Australian male dramatists and playwrights
Australian male non-fiction writers
Australian memoirists
Australian political writers
Australian satirists
Australian screenwriters
Australian television writers
Australian travel writers
La Trobe University alumni
Living people
Monash University alumni
People from Warragul
Australian social commentators
Walkley Award winners
Writers from Victoria (Australia)
Australian male television writers